The Class 80 tank engines were German standard locomotives (Einheitsloks) with the Deutsche Reichsbahn. They were intended to replace the aging, rickety state railway line engines performing shunting duties in their dotage at large stations.

History 

Between 1927 and 1928, 39 vehicles were produced, having been built in the locomotive factories of Jung in Jungenthal, Union Gießerei in Königsberg, Wolf and Hohenzollern. With the development of the Class 80, a relatively economical and simple locomotive class, it was hoped that the cost of shunting duties would come down.

After they had been on duty, prior to the Second World War, primarily in the area of Leipzig (including the shunting of post vans) and Cologne, 22 units went into the DR in East Germany, post-1945, and 17 to the Deutsche Bundesbahn. They were in service with the DR until 1968.

In the Federal Republic of Germany, the last Bundesbahn engine was taken out of service in 1965. Several examples survived in the Ruhrgebiet until 1977 as industrial locomotives with the Ruhrkohle AG.

Preserved Locomotives 

A total of seven locomotives of this class have been preserved:

 80 009 belongs to a private owner, Peter Haschke, and stands in his garden.
 80 013 (Hagans factory no. 1227, 1927) is non-operational at the German Steam Locomotive Museum in Neuenmarkt-Wirsberg.
 80 014 has been cosmetically restored and is in the South German Railway Museum, Heilbronn (Süddeutsches Eisenbahnmuseum Heilbronn).
 80 023 has belonged to the Dresden Transport Museum since 1981. It is maintained by IG Bahnbetriebswerk Dresden-Altstadt in the Dresden-Altstadt shed.
 80 030, in photo-livery is in the Bochum Dahlhausen Railway Museum.
 80 036 of the Dutch Steam Locomotive Union Veluwsche Stoomtrein Maatschappij is currently undergoing a major overhaul and will be back in service for heritage trips.
 80 039 is working and is used by the Hamm Museum Railway for specials.

See also
 List of DRG locomotives and railbuses

References

External links 
 Einheits-Güterzugtenderlokomotive 80 014 Süddeutsches Eisenbahnmuseum Heilbronn

Railway locomotives introduced in 1927
0-6-0T locomotives
80
Arnold Jung locomotives
Hohenzollern locomotives
80
Standard gauge locomotives of Germany
C h2t locomotives
Shunting locomotives
Union Giesserei locomotives